Bura is a town in Tana River County, Kenya.

Location
The town lies on the west bank of the Tana River, approximately 50 km north of Hola, the headquarters of Tana River County, and about 100 km south of Garissa town. The coordinates of Bura are: 1°11'39.1S, 39°50'23.0"E (Latitude:-1.503606; Longitude:39.837802).

Overview
Bura is also known as Bura-Tana and Bura-West with postal code 70104. It is most know for being the centre for the Bura Irrigation and Settlement Project. The water treatments works in Bura town are a landmark that can be seen from 20 km.

References

External links 
 Bura Research Project

Populated places in Tana River County
Populated places in Kenya